Locust Street Historic District is a national historic district located at Washington, Franklin County, Missouri. The district encompasses 123 contributing buildings in a predominantly residential section of Washington. The district developed between about 1839 and 1949, and includes representative examples of Italianate, Queen Anne, Colonial Revival, and Bungalow / American Craftsman style residential architecture. Located in the district is the separately listed Franz Schwarzer House.  Other notable buildings include the Lucinda Owens House (1839), Frederich Griese House (c. 1865), Sophia Greiwe House (c 1865), Presbyterian Church (1916), Hy. Oberhaus House (c. 1928), Gustav Richert Apartment Building (c. 1930), Southern Presbyterian Church/Attucks School (1868), Washington High School (1887), and AME Church (c. 1890)

It was listed on the National Register of Historic Places in 2000.

References

Historic districts on the National Register of Historic Places in Missouri
Italianate architecture in Missouri
Queen Anne architecture in Missouri
Colonial Revival architecture in Missouri
Bungalow architecture in Missouri
Buildings and structures in Franklin County, Missouri
National Register of Historic Places in Franklin County, Missouri